Chaim Icyk Bermant (26 February 192920 January 1998) was a British-based journalist, and author. Born in Braslav, Belarus, he spent much of his childhood in Barovke, Latvia, and Scotland.  He was educated at Queen's Park Secondary School in Glasgow, Glasgow University, where he graduated in economics, and the London School of Economics.

He contributed regularly to The Jewish Chronicle and occasionally to the national press, particularly The Observer. An Orthodox Jew and supporter of Israel, he was freely critical of both. He wrote several novels and non-fiction works, mostly on the quirks of British Jewish society.

Biography 
Chaim Icyk Bermant was born on 26 February 1929 in Breslev, Poland. His father was a Rabbi.

Bermant studied at the University of Glasgow and the London School of Economics.

Bermant married Judith Rose Weil on 16 December 1962 at Adath Israel Synagogue in Stoke Newington, London. Together they had four children: Aliza, Evie, Azriel and Daniel Bermant.

Bermant died on 20 January 1998 in Hampstead Garden Suburb, London from a myocardial infarction.

Works

Fiction
Belshazzar 
Ben Preserve Us 
Berl Make Tea 
The Companion 
Dancing Bear 
Diary Of An Old Man 
Here Endeth The Lesson 
House Of Women 
Jericho Sleep Alone 
The Last Supper 
Now Dowager 
Now Newman Was Old
The Patriarch 
Roses are Blooming in Picardy 
The Squire Of Bor Shachor 
The Second Mrs Whitberg 
Swinging In The Rain 
Titch 
The Walled Garden

Non-fiction
The Cousinhood 
Ebla 
Israel 
Murmurings of A Licensed Heretic
On The Other Hand
The Jews 
London's East End: Point of Arrival
Lord Jacobovits: an Authorised Biography of the Chief Rabbi
Troubled Eden: An Anatomy of British Jewry
What's the Joke: A Study of Jewish Humour through the Ages

Autobiography

Genesis: A Latvian Childhood
Coming Home

References

External links
Family website

1929 births
1998 deaths
Scottish journalists
Scottish novelists
Scottish Jews
Scottish Jewish writers
Latvian Jews
20th-century British novelists